Jim Brosnan (1930 – 3 December 2011) was a Gaelic footballer, manager and administrator from Co. Kerry. He played with Kerry during the 1940s and 1950s.

Personal life 

Brosnan started his life in Moyvane, being the son of the famous Con. Con collected six medals back in the twenties and thirties. His brother Mick, who was also a doctor, spent his life practising in England. Brosnan practised his medicine in Dingle.

Club 

He played club football with Moyvane and Shannon Rangers. He won a number of North Kerry Senior Football Championships with Moyvane.

He won All-Irelands with Kerry in 1953 and 1955. He was flown home specially for the 1955 final from America. He also won a National League medal in 1959. He also won a Munster Minor Championship medal in 1948.

During his college days he was a star with UCC. He won 2 Sigerson Cup titles with the college in 1943 and 1946. He was selected on the 2011 Sigerson Team of the Century.

As a manager he led Kerry to back to back All Ireland Minor titles in 1962 and 63.

Brosnan took over as Kerry team trainer in 1965. He held this position until 1968

As an administrator he served as chairman of the Kerry County Board for several years. It was he who was instrumental in putting the Kerry club structure in place which is very often envied by other counties. He also served as chairman of the Dingle club.

References

External links
 Jim Brosnan at Terrace Talk
 Kerry at hoganstand.com
 Kerry GAA mourns Dr Jim Brosnan. 5/12/11. hoganstand.com

1930 births
2011 deaths
Alumni of University College Cork
Chairmen of county boards of the Gaelic Athletic Association
Gaelic games club administrators
Irish general practitioners
Kerry County Board administrators
Kerry inter-county Gaelic footballers
Moyvane Gaelic footballers
Munster inter-provincial Gaelic footballers
UCC Gaelic footballers
People from Dingle